James Stuart Blackton (January 5, 1875 – August 13, 1941) was a British-American film producer and director of the silent era. One of the pioneers of motion pictures, he founded Vitagraph Studios in 1897. He was one of the first filmmakers to use the techniques of stop-motion and drawn animation, is considered a father of American animation, and was the first to bring many classic plays and books to the screen. Blackton was also the commodore of the Motorboat Club of America and the Atlantic Yacht Club.

Biography
James Stuart Blackton was born on January 5, 1875, in Sheffield, Yorkshire, England, to Henry Blacktin and Jessie Stuart. Henry Blacktin emigrated with his family to the United States in 1885 and changed the family name to Blackton.

He worked as a reporter and illustrator for the New York Evening World, and performed regularly on stage with conjuror Albert Smith.  In 1896, Thomas Edison publicly demonstrated the Vitascope, one of the first film projectors, and Blackton was sent to interview Edison and provide drawings of how his films were made. Eager for good publicity, Edison took Blackton to his Black Maria, the special cabin he used to do his filming, and created a film on the spot of Blackton doing a lightning portrait of Edison. The inventor did such a good job selling the art of moviemaking that he talked Blackton and partner Smith into buying a print of the new film, as well as prints of nine other films, plus a Vitascope to show them to paying audiences.

The new act was a great success, despite the various things Blackton and Smith were doing between the Edison films. The next step was to start making films of their own. In this way the American Vitagraph Company was born.

During this period, J. Stuart Blackton ran the Vitagraph studio, and produced, directed, and wrote its films. He even starred in some of his films, playing the comic strip character "Happy Hooligan" in a series of shorts. Since profits were constantly increasing, Blackton felt that he could try any idea that sprang to his head, and in a series of films Blackton developed the concepts of animation.

Animated films
The first of his animation films is The Enchanted Drawing, with a copyright date of 1900 but probably made at least a year earlier. In this film, Blackton sketches a face, a bottle of wine and a glass, a top hat, and a cigar. During the film he appears to remove the wine, glass, hat, and cigar as real objects, and the face appears to react. The "animation" here is of the stop-action variety, where the camera is stopped, a single change is made, and the camera is then started again. The process was first used by Georges Méliès and others.

The transition to stop-motion was apparently accidental, and occurred around 1905. According to Albert Smith, one day the crew was filming a complex series of stop-action effects on the roof while steam from the building's generator was billowing in the background. On playing the film back, Smith noticed the odd effect created by the steam puffs scooting across the screen and decided to reproduce it deliberately. A few films (some of which are lost) use this effect to represent invisible ghosts, or to have toys come to life. In 1906, Blackton directed Humorous Phases of Funny Faces, which uses stop-motion as well as stick puppetry to produce a series of effects. After Blackton's hand draws two faces on a chalkboard, they appear to come to life and engage in antics. Most of the film uses live action effects instead of animation, but nevertheless this film had a huge effect in stimulating the creation of animated films in America. In Europe, the same effect was had from The Haunted Hotel (1907), another Vitagraph short directed by Blackton. The Haunted Hotel was mostly live-action, about a tourist spending the night in an inn run by invisible spirits. Most of the effects are also live-action (wires and such), but one scene of a dinner making itself was done using stop-motion, and was presented in a tight close-up that allowed budding animators to study it for technique.

Blackton made another animated film that has survived, 1907's Lightning Sketches, but it has nothing to add to the art of animation. In 1908 he made the first American film version of Romeo and Juliet, filmed in New York City's Central Park and The Thieving Hand, filmed in Flatbush, Brooklyn. By 1909, Blackton was too absorbed in the business of running Vitagraph to have time for filmmaking. He came to regard his animation experiments in particular as being rather juvenile (they receive no mention in his unpublished autobiography).

Dramatic films and later life

Stuart Blackton believed that the US should join the Allies involved in World War I overseas and in 1915 produced The Battle Cry of Peace. Former President Theodore Roosevelt was one of the film's staunchest supporters and convinced Gen. Leonard Wood to loan Blackton an entire regiment of marines to use as extras. Upon its release, the film generated a controversy rivaling that of The Birth of a Nation because it was considered as militaristic propaganda.

Blackton left Vitagraph to go independent in 1917, but returned in 1923 as junior partner to Albert Smith.  In 1925, Smith sold the company to Warner Brothers for more than $1 million.

Blackton did quite well with his share until the Stock Market Crash of 1929, which destroyed his savings and made him bankrupt in 1931.  He spent his last years on the road, showing his old films and lecturing about the days of silent movies. His daughter Violet Virginia Blackton (1910–1965) married writer Cornell Woolrich in 1930 but their marriage was annulled in 1933.

He married actress Evangeline Russell in 1936.

Blackton died August 13, 1941, a few days after he suffered a fractured skull after being hit by a car while crossing the street with his son. At the time of his death he was working for Hal Roach on experiments to improve color process backgrounds. Blackton was cremated and interred at Forest Lawn Memorial Park Cemetery in Glendale, California.

Select filmography

Archives
Blackton's film The Film Parade was restored by the UCLA Film and Television Archive in 2009.  The Academy Film Archive preserved Blackton's 1910 film A Modern Cinderella in 2012.

References

Further reading

External links 

 J. Stuart Blackton at the AFI Catalog of Feature Films, American Film Institute
 

1875 births
1941 deaths
Cinema pioneers
American film producers
American film production company founders
Burials at Forest Lawn Memorial Park (Glendale)
American film studio executives
Road incident deaths in California
Pedestrian road incident deaths
Film people from Sheffield
Vaudeville performers
Articles containing video clips
British emigrants to the United States
American people of English descent